Penzance is a town, civil parish and port in Cornwall, United Kingdom. As well as the town of Penzance, the civil parish also includes the town and port of Newlyn and the villages of Gulval, Heamoor, Mousehole and Paul.

Key

Penzance

Gulval

Mousehole

Newlyn

Paul

References

Citations

Sources

Bibliography
 
 

Listed
Lists of listed buildings in Cornwall